Gymnobathra jubata is a moth of the family Oecophoridae. It was described by Philpott in 1918. It is found in New Zealand.

References

 Gymnobathra jubata in species-id

Moths described in 1918
Oecophoridae